Liao Ming-hsiung (born 18 October 1968 in Hengchun Township, Pingtung County, Taiwan), nicknamed "Prince of Baseball", is a retired Taiwanese professional baseball player (position:outfielder).

Career
A well-known slugger since college era in the Chinese Culture University,  Liao is best known for hitting the game-winning RBI twice in the two Chinese Taipei versus Japan matches in the 1992 Summer Olympics's preliminary round and semifinal, where Chinese Taipei finally won the silver medal.

After the 1992 Olympics Liao joined Chinese Professional Baseball League along with the just-established China Times Eagles. He had been gaining popularity for his excellent batting performance (Liao hit 84 home runs in only 416 games, at a speed which was only controversially surpassed by Chia-Hsian Hsieh in the Professional baseball in Taiwan history). However, in June 1997 he was expelled by the Chinese Professional Baseball League after he was confirmed to be involved in The Black Eagles Incident. Liao's fame immediately vanished and he was rumored only could work as a street vendor around 1999-2000. Liao later sought to join Taiwan Major League in 2001 but was refused.

In 2004 Liao started to coach in the China Baseball League under 1992 Summer Olympics fellow Chiang Tai-Chuan. He returned to Taiwan one season later to coach Taiwanese high school baseball teams, and runs a small business.

Before the Chinese Professional Baseball League's 2007 season started, the Uni-President Lions invited Liao to lecture, warning its current players the seriousness of cheating in the game.

Statistics
In the 1992 Olympics:
{|border=1　
|- style="background:LIGHTGREY"
|Hitting average||Games||At bat||Runs||Hits||RBI||Doubles||Triples||HR||K||BB
|- align=middle
||0.375||9||32||6||12||7||2||0||3||7||3
|-
|}

CPBL career:

External links
profile

1968 births
Living people
Asian Games competitors for Chinese Taipei
Baseball outfielders
Baseball players at the 1990 Asian Games
Baseball players at the 1992 Summer Olympics
China Times Eagles players
Medalists at the 1992 Summer Olympics
Olympic silver medalists for Taiwan
Olympic baseball players of Taiwan
Olympic medalists in baseball
People from Pingtung County
Taiwanese baseball players